Levunovo is a village in the municipality of Sandanski, in Blagoevgrad Province, Bulgaria. A notable citizen of the village is Metodi Mirazchiiski.

References

Villages in Blagoevgrad Province